This is a list of every rank used by the United States Army, with dates showing each rank's beginning and end.

Ranks used to the end of the Revolutionary War are shown as ending on June 2, 1784. This is the date that the Continental Army was ordered to be demobilized; actual demobilization took until June 20.

A
 Acting Hospital Steward: March 1, 1887 - March 2, 1903
 Apothecary: July 27, 1775 - June 2, 1784
 Apothecary General: February 27, 1777 - June 2, 1784, March 2, 1799 - May 14, 1800, March 3, 1813 - March 2, 1821 
 Armorer: March 14, 1777 - May 27, 1778
 Artificer: March 5, 1792 - June 3, 1916
 Assistant Apothecary : March 30, 1813 - March 2, 1821
 Assistant Apothecary General: October 6, 1780 - July 23, 1782
 Assistant Band Leader: June 3, 1916 - July 1, 1920
 Assistant Chauffeur: July 15, 1917 - July 1, 1920
 Assistant Commissary: March 3, 1813 - March 2, 1821
 Assistant Deputy Apothecary: September 20, 1781 - June 2, 1784
 Assistant Deputy Director of Hospitals: January 7, 1777 - May 9, 1777
 Assistant District Paymaster: April 18, 1814 - March 3, 1815
 Assistant Engineer: June 3, 1916 - July 1, 1920
 Assistant Medical Purveyor: October 6, 1780 - July 23, 1782, July 28, 1866 - July 27, 1892  
 Assistant Steward, Mine Planter Service: July 9, 1918 - July 1, 1920
 Assistant Surgeon: March 2, 1821 - April 23, 1908
 Assistant Surgeon General: April 14, 1818 - March 2, 1821, April 16, 1862 - April 23, 1908
 Aviator: June 3, 1916 - July 1, 1920

B
 Band Corporal: June 3, 1916 - July 1, 1920
 Band Leader: June 3, 1916 - June 4, 1920
 Band Sergeant: June 3, 1916 - July 1, 1920
 Battalion Commissary Sergeant: July 29, 1861 - July 28, 1866
 Battalion Hospital Steward: July 29, 1861 - July 28, 1866
 Battalion Quartermaster Sergeant: July 29, 1861 - June 3, 1916
 Battalion Saddler Sergeant: July 29, 1861 - July 17, 1862
 Battalion Sergeant Major: July 29, 1861 - July 1, 1920
 Battalion Supply Sergeant: June 3, 1916 - July 1, 1920
 Battalion Veterinary Sergeant: July 29, 1861 - July 17, 1862
 Battery Quartermaster Sergeant: April 26, 1898 - June 3, 1916
 Battery Supply Sergeant: June 3, 1916 - July 1, 1920
 Blacksmith: March 3, 1799  - April 12, 1808, June 26, 1812  - March 3, 1815
 Boatswain, Sea Fencibles: July 26, 1813 - February 27, 1815
 Bombardier: July 29, 1775 - June 2, 1784
 Brigadier General: June 17, 1775 - June 2, 1784, March 3, 1791 -
 Bugler: March 30, 1814 - March 3, 1815, March 2, 1833 - March 3, 1863, June 3, 1916 - July 1, 1920
 Bugler First Class: July 9, 1918 - July 1, 1920

C
 Captain: June 14, 1775 -
 Captain Lieutenant: July 29, 1775 - June 2, 1784
 Chaplain: March 3, 1791 - June 4, 1920
 Chauffeur: July 24, 1917 - July 1, 1920
 Chauffeur First Class: July 24, 1917 - July 1, 1920
 Chief Bugler: March 2, 1833 - July 17, 1862
 Chief Hospital Physician: September 30, 1780 - January 3, 1782
 Chief Mechanic: January 25, 1907 - July 1, 1920
 Chief Medical Purveyor: July 28, 1866 - July 27, 1892
 Chief Musician: March 2, 1799  - March 16, 1802, March 3, 1869 - June 3, 1916
 Chief Physician: July 15, 1775 - December 1, 1776, March 22, 1780 - June 2, 1784
 Chief Physician and Hospital Surgeon: March 1, 1781 - June 2, 1784
 Chief Physician and Surgeon of the Army: October 6, 1780 - December 23, 1783
 Chief Trumpeter: July 17, 1862 - June 3, 1916
 Chief Warrant Officer: August 21, 1941 - May 29, 1954
 Chief Warrant Officer 2: May 29, 1954 -
 Chief Warrant Officer 3: May 29, 1954 -
 Chief Warrant Officer 4: May 29, 1954  -
 Chief Warrant Officer 5: December 5, 1991 -
 Colonel: July 18, 1775 - June 2, 1784, March 8, 1802 -
 Color Sergeant: February 2, 1901 - July 1, 1920
 Command Sergeant Major: July 12, 1967 -
 Commissary General of Issues: June 10, 1777 - July 10, 1781
 Commissary General of Purchases: June 10, 1777 - July 10, 1781, March 28, 1812 - April 22, 1842 
 Commissary Sergeant: March 3, 1873 - March 2, 1899
 Company Commissary Sergeant: July 17, 1862 - July 28, 1866
 Company Quartermaster Sergeant: July 29, 1861 - May 15, 1872, April 26, 1898 - June 3, 1916
 Company Supply Sergeant: June 3, 1916 - July 1, 1920
 Cook: July 7, 1898 - July 1, 1920
 Cornet: June 15, 1776 - June 2, 1784, March 3, 1792 - March 3, 1799, April 12, 1808 - March 3, 1815
 Corporal: June 14, 1775 - June 2, 1784, June 3, 1784 -
 Corporal Bugler: July 9, 1918 - July 1, 1920

D
 Deck hand, Mine Planter Service: July 9, 1918 - July 1, 1920
 Deputy Commissary: March 28, 1812 - March 2, 1821
 Deputy Commissary General of Issues: June 10, 1777 - June 28, 1780
 Deputy Commissary General of Purchases: June 10, 1777 - July 10, 1780
 Deputy Director General of Hospitals: April 7, 1777- September 30, 1780
 Deputy Paymaster General: June 7, 1776 - January 17, 1781
 Deputy Surgeon General: July 27, 1892- April 23, 1908
 Director General and Chief Physician: July 27, 1775 - June 2, 1784
 District Paymaster: May 16, 1812 - April 24, 1816
 Driver of Artillery: May 16, 1812 - March 30, 1814
 Drum Major: July 16, 1776 - June 2, 1784, July 29, 1861 - July 28, 1866, March 2, 1899 - June 3, 1916
 Drummer: June 14, 1775- June 2, 1784, April 12, 1785 - October 3, 1787

E
 Electrician Sergeant: March 2, 1899 - January 25, 1907
 Electrician Sergeant First Class: January 25, 1907 - July 1, 1920
 Electrician Sergeant Second Class: January 25, 1907 - July 1, 1920
 Engineer: January 25, 1907 - July 1, 1920
 Enlisted Men of Ordnance: May 14, 1812 - July 5, 1862
 Ensign: July 18, 1775 - June 2, 1784, June 3, 1784 - March 3, 1799, March 16, 1802 - March 3, 1815

F
 Farrier: March 14, 1777 - June 2, 1784, March 3, 1792 - March 16, 1802, April 12, 1808 - March 3, 1815, March 23, 1910 - July 1, 1920
 Farrier and Blacksmith: March 2, 1833 - March 23, 1910
 Field Clerk: August 29, 1916 - April 27, 1926
 Fife Major: July 16, 1776 - June 2, 1784
 Fifer: June 18, 1775 - June 2, 1784, April 12, 1785 - October 3, 1787
 Fireman: January 25, 1907 - July 1, 1920
 First Lieutenant: March 3, 1799 -
 First Sergeant: July 5, 1838 -
 Flight Officer: July 8, 1942 - July 26, 1947

G
 Garrison Surgeon: March 16, 1802 - April 24, 1816
 Garrison Surgeon's Mate: March 3, 1791 - March 3, 1795, March 16, 1802 - April 24, 1816
 General: October 6, 1917 - June 30, 1920, February 23, 1929 -
 General and Commander in Chief: June 17, 1775 - December 23, 1783
 General of the Armies of the United States: September 3, 1919 - September 13, 1924
 General of the Army: December 14, 1944 - April 8, 1981
 General of the Army of the United States: July 25, 1866 - February 8, 1884, June 1, 1888 - August 5, 1888
 General Service Clerk: July 29, 1886 - August 6, 1894
 General Service Messenger: July 29, 1886 - August 6, 1894
 Gunner, Sea Fencibles: July 26, 1813 - February 27, 1815

H
 Horseshoer: March 23, 1910 - July 1, 1920
 Hospital Chaplain: May 20, 1862 - April 9, 1864
 Hospital Sergeant: June 3, 1916 - July 1, 1920
 Hospital Steward: April 15, 1856 - March 2, 1903
 Hospital Surgeon: March 2, 1799 - May 14, 1800, April 12, 1808 - April 14, 1818
 Hospital Surgeon's Mate: March 2, 1799 - May 14, 1800, April 12, 1808 - April 14, 1818

J
 Judge Advocate: July 29, 1775 - August 10, 1776, April 10, 1777 - June 3, 1782, January 11, 1812 - March 2, 1821

L
 Lance Corporal: March 2, 1821 - August 3, 1920
 Lieutenant: June 14, 1775 - June 2, 1784, June 3, 1784 - March 3, 1799 
 Lieutenant Colonel: July 18, 1775 - June 2, 1784, June 3, 1784
 Lieutenant General: May 28, 1798 - March 3, 1799, February 29, 1864                                                                                                                                                                                                        - August 5, 1888, February 5, 1895 - September 29, 1895, June 6, 1900 - June 2, 1909, October 6, 1918 - June 30, 1920, August 5, 1939 -

M
 Major: July 29, 1775 - June 2, 1784, June 3, 1784 -
 Major General: June 17, 1775 - June 2, 1784, March 3, 1791 - March 3, 1797, May 28, 1798 - March 16, 1802, January 11, 1812 -
 Master Electrician: March 2, 1903 - June 3, 1916
 Master Engineer Junior Grade: June 3, 1916 - July 1, 1920
 Master Engineer Senior Grade: June 3, 1916 - July 1, 1920
 Master Gunner: January 25, 1907 - July 1, 1920
 Master Hospital Sergeant: June 3, 1916 - July 1, 1920
 Master of the Sword: June 26, 1812 - March 3, 1815
 Master Sergeant: July 1, 1920 -
 Master Signal Electrician: April 28, 1904 - July 1, 1920
 Master Specialist: July 1, 1955 - March 1, 1958
 Master Wagoner: August 3, 1861 - 1879
 Master Warrant Officer: April 8, 1988 - December 5, 1991
 Mechanic: March 2, 1899 - July 1, 1920
 Medical Cadet: August 3, 1861 - July 28, 1866
 Medical Inspector: April 16, 1862 - November 20, 1865
 Medical Inspector General: April 16, 1862 - October 31, 1865
 Medical Purveyor: March 2, 1799 - May 14, 1800
 Medical Storekeeper: May 20, 1862 - June 28, 1878
 Mess Sergeant: June 3, 1916 - July 1, 1920
 Military Agent: March 16, 1802 - March 28, 1812
 Military Storekeeper: March 3, 1813 - March 3, 1875, July 1, 1898 - March 2, 1899, August 29, 1916 - November 13, 1926 
 Musician: October 3, 1787 - June 3, 1916 
 Musician First Class: June 3, 1916 - July 1, 1920
 Musician Second Class: June 3, 1916 - July 1, 1920
 Musician Third Class: June 3, 1916 - July 1, 1920

O
 Oiler, Mine Planter Service: July 9, 1918 - July 1, 1920
 Ordnance Sergeant: April 5, 1832 - July 1, 1920
 Ordnance Storekeeper: July 28, 1866 - October 3, 1903

P
 Paymaster: April 24, 1816 - March 3, 1847
 Paymaster General: June 16, 1775 - August 1, 1788, May 8, 1792 - March 3, 1847
 Physician and Surgeon General: April 7, 1777 - January 1, 1781, March 3, 1813 - June 15, 1815  
 Physician General: May 28, 1798 - May 14, 1800
 Physician General of Hospitals: April 7, 1777 - July 21, 1780
 Post Chaplain: July 28, 1866 - February 2, 1901
 Post Commissary Sergeant: March 2, 1899 - August 24, 1912
 Post Quartermaster Sergeant: July 5, 1884 - August 24, 1912
 Post Surgeon: April 24, 1816 - March 2, 1821
 Principal Musician: April 12, 1808 - June 3, 1916
 Principal Teamster: March 3, 1847 - February 3, 1848
 Private: June 14, 1775 -
 Private First Class: May 15, 1846 -
 Private of the Hospital Corps.: March 1, 1887- March 2, 1903
 Private Second Class: May 15, 1846 - July 1, 1920

Q
 Quarter Gunner, Sea Fencibles: July 26, 1813 - February 27, 1815
 Quartermaster General: March 3, 1791 - March 16, 1802
 Quartermaster Sergeant: July 16, 1776 - June 2, 1784, April 12, 1808 - March 2, 1899 
 Quartermaster Sergeant Senior Grade: June 3, 1916 - July 1, 1920
 Quartermaster Sergeant, Quartermaster Corps: August 24, 1912 - July 1, 1920

R
 Radio Sergeant: June 3, 1916 - July 1, 1920
 Regimental Commissary Sergeant: July 22, 1861 - July 15, 1870, March 2, 1899 - June 3, 1916 
 Regimental Hospital Steward: July 22, 1861 - July 15, 1870
 Regimental Quartermaster Sergeant: March 2, 1899 - June 3, 1916
 Regimental Sergeant Major: March 2, 1899 - July 1, 1920
 Regimental Supply Sergeant: June 3, 1916 - July 1, 1920
 Riding Master: March 14, 1777 - June 2, 1784, April 12, 1808 - March 3, 1815

S
 Saddler: March 14, 1777 - June 2, 1784, March 5, 1792 - March 16, 1802, April 12, 1808 - March 3, 1815, July 29, 1861 - July 1, 1920 
 Saddler Sergeant: July 29, 1861 - March 2, 1899
 Second Lieutenant: March 3, 1799 -
 Senior Musician: April 30, 1790 - March 3, 1799
 Sergeant: June 14, 1775 - June 2, 1784, June 3, 1784 -
 Sergeant Bugler: June 3, 1916 - July 1, 1920
 Sergeant First Class: October 1, 1890 - July 1, 1920, August 1, 1948
 Sergeant Major: July 16, 1776 - June 2, 1784, May 20, 1796 - March 2, 1899, June 1, 1958 -  July 12, 1967, November 1, 1969 
 Sergeant Major of the Army: July 11, 1966 -
 Sergeant Major, Junior Grade: February 2, 1901 - July 1, 1920
 Sergeant Major, Senior Grade: February 2, 1901 - July 1, 1920
 Specialist: October 1, 1985 -
 Specialist 4: June 1, 1958 - October 1, 1985 
 Specialist 5: June 1, 1958 - October 1, 1985 
 Specialist 6: June 1, 1958 - October 1, 1985 
 Specialist 7: June 1, 1958 - March 1, 1978
 Specialist 8: June 1, 1958 - September 1, 1965
 Specialist 9: June 1, 1958 - September 1, 1965
 Specialist Fifth Class: July 1, 1920 - June 1, 1942
 Specialist First Class: July 1, 1920 - June 1, 1942, July 1, 1955 - June 1, 1958
 Specialist Fourth Class: July 1, 1920 - June 1, 1942
 Specialist Second Class: July 1, 1920 - June 1, 1942, July 1, 1955 - June 1, 1958
 Specialist Sixth Class: July 1, 1920 - June 1, 1942
 Specialist Third Class: July 1, 1920 - June 1, 1942, July 1, 1955 - June 1, 1958 
 Squadron Sergeant Major: March 2, 1899 - July 1, 1920
 Stable Sergeant: March 2, 1899 - July 1, 1920
 Staff Sergeant: July 1, 1920 - August 1, 1948, June 1, 1958 -
 Staff Sergeant Major: July 12, 1967 - November 1, 1969
 Steward, Mine Planter Service: July 9, 1918 - July 1, 1920
 Supply Sergeant: June 3, 1916 - July 1, 1920
 Surgeon: July 29, 1775 - June 2, 1784, June 3, 1784 - March 16, 1802, April 12, 1808 - April 23, 1908
 Surgeon General: April 14, 1818 - April 23, 1908
 Surgeon's Mate: July 29, 1775 - June 2, 1784, June 3, 1784 - March 16, 1802, April 12, 1808 - March 2, 1821

T
 Teacher of Drawing: February 28, 1803 - April 29, 1812
 Teacher of Music: March 16, 1802 - April 12, 1808
 Teacher of The French Language: February 28, 1803 - April 29, 1812
 Teamster: March 3, 1847 - February 3, 1848
 Technical Sergeant: July 1, 1920 - August 1, 1948
 Technician Grade 3: June 1, 1942 - August 1, 1948
 Technician Grade 4: June 1, 1942 - August 1, 1948
 Technician Grade 5: June 1, 1942 - August 1, 1948
 Third Lieutenant: January 20, 1813 - March 2, 1821, June 15, 1832 - March 2, 1833
 Troop Quartermaster Sergeant: April 26, 1898 - June 3, 1916
 Trumpeter: June 14, 1775 - June 2, 1784, March 5, 1792 - March 3, 1799, January 11, 1812 - March 3, 1815, March 3, 1863 - June 3, 1916

V
 Veterinary Surgeon: March 3, 1863 - July 28, 1866 
 Veterinarian: March 2, 1899- June 3, 1916

W
 Wagoner: July 22, 1861 - July 1, 1920
 Warrant Officer: July 9, 1918 - August 21, 1941
 Warrant Officer 1: May 29, 1954 -
 Warrant Officer Junior Grade: August 21, 1941 - May 29, 1954

References

Military ranks of the United States Army